Ashok Gangadean (born September 26, 1941) is a Trinidadian philosopher, author and spiritual activist. He is the Margaret Gest Professor of Global Philosophy at Haverford College in Haverford, Pennsylvania and the Founder and Director of the Global Dialogue Institute.

Biography
Gangadean received his PhD in philosophy from Brandeis University. He was the first Director of the Margaret Gest Center for the Cross-Cultural Study of Religion at Haverford, and has spoken at various professional conferences on interfaith dialogue and East-West comparative philosophy. He is currently the Co-Convenor of the recently formed World Commission on Global Consciousness and Spirituality.

Works
 Meditative Reason: Towards Universal Grammar (1993)
 Between Worlds: The Emergence of Global Reason (1998) 
 Meditations of Global First Philosophy (2008)
 Awakening the Global Mind: A New Philosophy for Healing Ourselves and Our World (2008)

References

External links
 Official web page at Haverford College

1941 births
20th-century essayists
20th-century non-fiction writers
21st-century essayists
21st-century non-fiction writers
21st-century philosophers
Haverford College faculty
Living people
Philosophers of culture
Philosophers of education
Philosophers of history
Philosophers of language
Philosophers of mind
Philosophers of religion
Philosophers of social science
Philosophy academics
Philosophy writers
Rationalists
Social commentators
Social philosophers
Theorists on Western civilization
Trinidad and Tobago activists
20th-century philosophers